Klaudia Jans-Ignacik and Kristina Mladenovic were the defending champions, but Jans-Ignacik could not participate on account of becoming a mother in early 2013. Mladenovic played alongside Galina Voskoboeva, but lost in the first round to Julia Görges and Barbora Záhlavová-Strýcová.

Seeds
The top four seeds receive a bye into the second round.

Draw

Finals

Top half

Bottom half

References

2013 WTA Tour
Women's Doubles
2013 in Canadian women's sports